Oregon Trail II is an educational video game released by MECC in 1995. It was published by SoftKey Multimedia. It is a revised version of the original The Oregon Trail video game. It was redesigned with the help of American Studies PhD Wayne Studer. In contrast to the original version of the game, Oregon Trail II made an effort to include greater roles for women and racial minorities.

In addition to the regular edition, MECC released a 25th Anniversary Limited Edition Oregon Trail II Computer Game. The CD-ROM came with an official strategy guide and certificate of authenticity, all packaged in a commemorative wooden storage box.

Development

Oregon Trail II graphics are considerably more detailed than those in the original. In addition, events such as diseases (including dysentery, measles, cholera, and others), obstacles on the path, accidents while traveling, and even interactions with other groups in one's wagon train involve being directed to choose a course of action from a set of multiple choices.

Gameplay
When players start a new game, they can choose their name, occupation, level, date of travel, their starting point and destination, and type of wagon. Also, they may select how many others are with them in their wagon, along with their names and ages. After selecting an occupation, the player can select various skills. The player chooses skills with a 120-point limit. Automatic skills are free. The more important the skill is, the more it costs. Each skill can make good events more likely to happen, and bad events less likely to happen. While some occupations have more money than others, the low income occupations get a greater final bonus, which proves crucial in getting a high score in the end of the game. However, if the player settles at a destination other than the one they had selected at the start of the game, they will not receive a bonus, regardless of their chosen occupation. 

Oregon Trail II includes far more detail than the original. For instance, rafting down the Columbia River is a much greater challenge than it was in the original game. Whenever an event (e.g. an accident or illness) happens, the game halts and the player must make a choice of action, so it is much more interactive than the previous version. Players are also able to talk with other settlers along the way and ask their advice. At any point in the game, if the player dies, the game is over. This version also allows the player to choose any year from 1840 through 1860 rather than being fixed to 1848 as it was in the original. Travel is much easier in later years, as there are more towns and trading posts along the way for resupply. The online guidebook resource alters its displayed help based upon the year of travel, but not with the target and trailhead ends chosen; hence to read the book, one needs to wade past pages of useless information applicable to sub-scenarios (such as alternate routes over a local regional stretch) one hasn't chosen.

Outfitting the supplies and choosing the parties equipment of their journey becomes a possible point of player control leading to increased scoring chances. Additional supplies means adding weight to the player's wagon. When the wagon's weight limit is reached, it is not possible to continue on the trail and some goods will have to be dumped. The game offers players an immense selection of supplies available for purchase. During the beginning of the game, package deals are available up to six months of provisions. However, many perils in the game will cause many provisions to be lost or used for trade. One has the option of taking a computer generated "package deal", ostensibly offered by the trailhead town's merchants. Or the player can shop the town and choose a custom strategy, quantities, tools and so forth or take the package then shop or trade in addition to that. One problem with the package is finding someone to trade for unwanted items for useful ones. Conversely, some assets are only available by the package (e.g. Chains, anvils, plows) or by trading, though many of those can be purchased from merchants or blacksmiths farther down the trails. If a player decides to buy supplies without the package, the player may buy chains or anvils from Westport, Fort Kearny or Fort Laramie. All forts or towns with a blacksmith's shop will sell chains, nails (measured in pounds), and anvils.

25th Anniversary Limited Edition

This version includes Oregon Trail II 1.3, Oregon Trail for DOS 2.1, Oregon Trail Deluxe VGA 3.01, Oregon Trail for Windows 1.2, a series of five interview videos for Oregon Trail game history, a collector's wooden box package with branded artwork on the sides, The Oregon Trail Strategy Guide, $25.00 rebate coupons for MECC/SoftKey International products, and a limited-edition stamped certificate of authenticity.

Remake

 The Oregon Trail 5th Edition: Adventures Along the Oregon Trail is a 2001 video game, and the sequel to The Oregon Trail 4th Edition.

Gameplay
The game design is based on Oregon Trail II, but adds various new features to the game. The plant gathering feature was carried over from the 3rd and 4th editions. The "Wild Fruits and Vegetables" event from Oregon Trail II is removed. This feature involves identifying which plants are edible and which are poisonous. Incidentally, the option to "go look for edible plants" whenever someone is diagnosed with scurvy was kept. The player can also go fishing. Updated graphics have been provided for river crossings. There are also added cinematics which follow the fictional journey of the three Montgomery children: Parker, Cassie, and Jimmy, who leave Independence accompanied by an African American trailblazer named Captain Jed Freedman to search for the children's father in Oregon. Various points of the children's story are triggered when the player reaches a certain destination on the trail, which ranges from dangerous experiences (Jimmy is bitten by a snake) to campfire scenes in which Captain Jed would tell a story that reflects other historically accurate incidents (e.g. the Donner Party, the California Gold Rush, and the Santa Fe Trail). The conversation pictures are no longer animated. The soundtrack of Oregon Trail II has also been removed, replaced with a single repeating audio loop.

Marketing
As part of the 25th anniversary of Oregon Trail, an online version called Oregon Trail Online was produced.

References

External links
 MECC (TLC Properties Inc.) page: Oregon Trail II, Oregon Trail II 25 Anniversary Edition, Oregon Trail II support
 MECC (The Learning Company) page: The Oregon Trail II
 Broderbund page: Oregon Trail II - 25th Anniversary v1.3 support, Oregon Trail II v1.0 / v1.2 support, Oregon Trail II v1.31 (BE) supprort
 Broderbund (Riverdeep Interactive Learning Limited) page: The Oregon Trail 5th Edition, Oregon Trail 5th Edition v 1.0 support, Oregon Trail 5 (RNV) support, Oregon Trail 5th Edition EEV (ATS) support, Oregon Trail 5th Edition EEV (School Edition) support
 Riverdeep Interactive Learning Limited page: Oregon Trail II (School Edition) support
 
 English in the Digital Age
 Official Strategy Guide

1995 video games
2001 video games
Children's educational video games
History educational video games
Classic Mac OS games
Survival video games
The Oregon Trail (series)
Video games set in the United States
Western (genre) video games
Windows games
Video games developed in the United States
Video games set in the 19th century
The Learning Company games